Popilius or Popillius is the nomen of the Roman gens Popillia.

Other uses
Popilius (beetle) a genus of beetles in the family Passalidae